Joseph Moffatt (1875–unknown) was a Scottish footballer who played in the Football League for Manchester City and Walsall.

Moffatt was at Tottenham Hotspur for only one season which was the 1900–01 season. In  Phil Soar's Tottenham Hotspur The Official Illustrated History 1882-1995, Moffatt is recorded having played five Southern League games and scoring three goals.

References

1875 births
Scottish footballers
English Football League players
Association football forwards
Bo'ness F.C. players
Abercorn F.C. players
Wishaw Thistle F.C. players
St Mirren F.C. players
Chatham Town F.C. players
Gravesend United F.C. players
Walsall F.C. players
Tottenham Hotspur F.C. players
Manchester City F.C. players
Kilmarnock F.C. players
Nelson F.C. players
Heart of Midlothian F.C. players
Watford F.C. players
Aberdeen F.C. players
Year of death missing